Nunzio "Nick" Discepola (November 27, 1949 – November 21, 2012) was an Italian-born Canadian politician and businessman.

Education and career
Discepola obtained a Bachelor of Science (1972) and a Master of Business Administration (1977) from McGill University.

Before founding his own company in the high tech sector "N.D. Computer Resources" at the age of 26, he worked for Bell Canada and the federal government as a computer specialist.

From 1989 to 1992 he served as mayor of Kirkland, Quebec.

Discepola was a Member of Parliament representing the Liberal Party of Canada in the House of Commons of Canada in the riding of Vaudreuil from 1993 to 1997 (serving as Parliamentary Secretary to the Solicitor General from 1996 to 1998), and then Vaudreuil-Soulanges between 1997 and 2004. In 2004, he lost his seat to the Bloc Québécois's Meili Faille.

Discepola died on November 21, 2012 of cancer six days shy of his 63rd birthday.

References

External links
 

1949 births
2012 deaths
Deaths from cancer in Quebec
Italian emigrants to Canada
Liberal Party of Canada MPs
Members of the House of Commons of Canada from Quebec
McGill University Faculty of Management alumni
Mayors of places in Quebec
People from Kirkland, Quebec
21st-century Canadian politicians